The Kemansah River is a river in the state of Selangor in Malaysia.

See also
 List of rivers of Malaysia

References

Rivers of Selangor
Rivers of Malaysia